Fear Yourself is a 2003 album by Daniel Johnston. It's his 15th album and is produced by Mark Linkous of Sparklehorse. It includes an 8-page booklet with exclusive Daniel Johnston drawings.

Track listing

References 

Daniel Johnston albums
1984 albums